Brewster  is a town in Barnstable County, Massachusetts, United States, Barnstable County being coextensive with Cape Cod. The population of Brewster was 10,318 at the 2020 census.

Brewster is twinned with the town of Budleigh Salterton in the United Kingdom.

History 
Brewster was first settled in 1656 as a northeastern parish of the town of Harwich. The town separated from Harwich as the northern, more wealthy parish in 1693, and was officially incorporated as its own town in 1803 when the less wealthy citizens of Harwich were upset that the town's institutions were all on Brewster's main street (now Route 6A), including the town hall and churches. Brewster was named in honor of Elder William Brewster, the first religious leader of the Pilgrims at Plymouth Colony. The town's history grew around Stony Brook, where the first water-powered grist and woolen mill in the country was founded in the late 17th century. There were many rich sea captains in the town, who built many of the mansions and stately homes which now constitute the town's inns and bed-and-breakfasts. Most notable of these are the Brewster Historical Society Capt. Elijah Cobb House on Lower Road, Crosby Mansion on Crosby Lane by Crosby Beach, and the Captain Freeman Inn on Breakwater Road.

Geography

Brewster is bordered on the north by Cape Cod Bay, on the west by Dennis, on the south by Harwich, and on the east by Orleans. The town is usually separated into two villages, West and East Brewster, both of which comprise the Brewster census-designated place.

The town is bordered by the Brewster Flats, an extensive stretch of tidal sand flats to the north, along the shores of Cape Cod Bay. The town is home to the Roland C. Nickerson State Forest Park, the largest state forest on Cape Cod. The town has several large ponds, especially along the Harwich town line. There are several brooks throughout the town, all of which lead to Cape Cod Bay. The bay is home to several boat landings and beaches in the town.

Brewster is home to the largest pond on Cape Cod, Long Pond. The Brewster-Harwich town line goes directly through the middle of the pond. Brewster's second largest pond is Cliff Pond, located in Nickerson State Park. Both are popular destinations.

Climate

According to the Köppen climate classification system, Brewster, Massachusetts has a warm-summer, wet all year, humid continental climate (Dfb). Dfb climates are characterized by at least one month having an average mean temperature ≤ 32.0 °F (≤ 0.0 °C), at least four months with an average mean temperature ≥ 50.0 °F (≥ 10.0 °C), all months with an average mean temperature ≤ 71.6 °F (≤ 22.0 °C), and no significant precipitation difference between seasons. The average seasonal (November–April) snowfall total is around 30 in (76 cm). The average snowiest month is February which corresponds with the annual peak in nor'easter activity. The plant hardiness zone is 7a with an average annual extreme minimum air temperature of 4.0 °F (–15.6 °C).

Ecology

According to the A. W. Kuchler U.S. Potential natural vegetation Types, Brewster, Massachusetts, would primarily contain a Northeastern Oak/Pine (110) vegetation type with a Southern Mixed Forest (26) vegetation form.

Transportation
U.S. Route 6 passes through the southeast corner of Brewster from southwest to northeast, as a two-lane expressway with no exits in the town, although exits 9 through 12 provide access to Brewster via other roads. The five other numbered highways in Brewster are all surface roads. Massachusetts Route 6A passes through the town from east to west as Main Street through the town center. Brewster has one stop light (blinking red light, four-way stop) at the intersection of Harwich Road (Route 124) and Long Pond Road (Route 137).

There is no rail or air service in the town. The Cape Cod Rail Trail, as well as several other bicycle trails, pass through the town. The nearest public airfield is in Chatham (Chatham Municipal, CQX); the nearest regional airport is Barnstable Municipal Airport (HYA), and the nearest national and international air service is at Logan International Airport in Boston.

Demographics

As of the census of 2000, there were 10,094 people, 4,124 households, and 2,853 families residing in the town. The racial makeup of the town was 97.24% White, 0.76% Black or African American, 0.23% Native American, 0.76% Asian, 0.03% Pacific Islander, 0.35% from other races, and 0.63% from two or more races. Hispanic or Latino of any race were 1.06% of the population.

There were 4,124 households, out of which 25.7% had children under the age of 18 living with them, 57.9% were married couples living together, 8.9% had a female householder with no husband present, and 30.8% were non-families. 24.8% of all households were made up of individuals, and 12.6% had someone living alone who was 65 years of age or older. The average household size was 2.34 and the average family size was 2.79.

In the town, the population was spread out, with 20.9% under the age of 18, 4.3% from 18 to 24, 21.5% from 25 to 44, 27.0% from 45 to 64, and 26.2% who were 65 years of age or older. The median age was 47 years. For every 100 females, there were 86.6 males. For every 100 females age 18 and over, there were 82.2 males.

The median income for a household in the town was $49,276, and the median income for a family was $57,174. Males had a median income of $41,407 versus $33,388 for females. The per capita income for the town was $24,638. About 1.6% of families and 3.7% of the population were below the poverty line, including 1.4% of those under age 18 and 3.1% of those age 65 or over.

Government

Brewster is represented in the Massachusetts House of Representatives as a part of the First  Barnstable District, along with Dennis and a portion of Yarmouth. The town is represented in the Massachusetts Senate as a part of the Cape and Islands District, which includes all of Cape Cod, Martha's Vineyard and Nantucket except the towns of Bourne, Falmouth, Sandwich and a portion of Barnstable. The town is patrolled by the Second (Yarmouth) Barracks of Troop D of the Massachusetts State Police.

On the national level, Brewster is a part of Massachusetts's 9th congressional district, and is currently represented by William Keating. The state's senior (Class II) member of the United States Senate, elected in 2012, is Elizabeth Warren. The junior (Class I) senator, elected in 2013, is Edward Markey.

Brewster is governed by the open town meeting form of government, led by an executive secretary and a board of selectmen. The town has its own police and fire departments. The fire department is located on Route 6A near the terminus of Route 137, while the police station is located about a half mile away on Route 124. There is a single post office near the geographic center of town, as well as the Brewster Ladies' Library, a 50,000-volume library which is a part of the Cape Libraries Automated Materials Sharing (CLAMS) library network. The Long Pond Medical Center, located just over the Harwich line at the intersection of Routes 6 and 137, serves the medical needs of the town, as well as the southeastern corner of the Cape.

Education
Brewster is a member of the Nauset Regional School District, along with the towns of Eastham, Orleans and Wellfleet. The town operates the Stony Brook Elementary School, which serves students from kindergarten through second grade, and the Eddy Elementary School, which serves students in third through fifth grades. Middle school students typically attend Nauset Middle School in Orleans, although the Cape Cod Lighthouse Charter School in East Harwich is an alternative choice. High school students attend Nauset Regional High School in North Eastham.

Additionally, the town's high school students may attend Cape Cod Regional Technical High School in neighboring Harwich free of charge. There are also two private schools, The Family School and The Laurel School, both of which serve elementary students.

The Sea Pines School operated in town from 1907 to 1972.

See also: Brewster (CDP), Massachusetts

Points of interest

Brewster Conservation Trust Walking Trails
Brewster Historical Society Museum
Brewster Ladies' Library
The Brewster Fish House
Brewster Oysters 
The Brewster Store
Brewster Sweets
Cape Cod Museum of Natural History
Captain Freeman Inn
Chatham Bars Inn Farm, Brewster
Crosby Mansion
Factory Village
JT's Seafood
Kate's Ice Cream
The Kitchen Cafe
The Lemon Tree Village
First Parish Brewster
Ocean Edge Resort & Golf Club
Stony Brook Grist Mill
Satucket Farms
Snowy Owl Coffee Roasters
Sweetwater Farms, breeding world and national caliber Appaloosas since 1979
Sweetwater Forest Cape Cod's Family Campground since 1958
The Woodshed

Parks and recreation
Brewster beaches, from east to west on the Cape Cod Bay are: Crosby Landing, Linnell Landing, Ellis Landing, Point of Rocks Landing, Breakwater Beach, Saint's Landing, Mant's Landing (Robbins Hill Beach), and Paines Creek Beach. In addition to the beaches on the northside, there are numerous important recreation areas in the town. The Drummer Boy Park on Route 6A has walking trails, picnic areas, playground, and an 18th-century windmill, the Old Higgins Farm Windmill, and blacksmith shop. Several hiking trails leave the Natural History museum, with the John Wing Trail going over a salt marsh boardwalk to Wing Island and the beach on Cape Cod Bay. Punkhorn Parklands also has thousands of acres of protected woodland with many hiking trails, the one to Eagle Point being particularly popular. Smaller conservation areas are available for hiking throughout the town.

Notable associations

In July 1888, Helen Keller and her teacher, Anne Sullivan, visited Brewster. In the photo, Helen is shown cradling a doll. The photograph was discovered almost 120 years after it was taken. The mother of the man who provided the photograph was Helen's playmate at the Elijah Cobb House.

Minnie Riperton's song, "Alone in Brewster Bay", refers to when Riperton and her husband, producer Dick Rudolph, vacationed on Cape Cod during the early 1970s, prior to the release of her 1975 hit single, "Lovin' You".

Samuel M. Nickerson, president of the First National Bank of Chicago, was one of the most influential business leaders of the time. Nickerson's shares in First National Bank were sold for $2.1M, according to The New York Times dated September 29, 1899. The syndicate that purchased the shares included J. P. Morgan, E. H. Harriman and Marshall Field. The Nickerson summer house, Fieldstone Hall in Brewster, is now a condominium resort called Ocean Edge.

The Brewster Whitecaps of the Cape Cod Baseball League has been the home of many current and former major league baseball stars, such as Aaron Judge, Mike Avilés, Brian Bannister, Sean Casey, Chris Dickerson, Hall of Famer Tony Gwynn and his son Tony Gwynn Jr., Matt Herges, Bobby Kielty, Mike Meyers, Aaron Rowand, Gaby Sánchez, and Billy Wagner. The Whitecaps play at Stony Brook Field.

In a 2011 episode of Who Do You Think You Are?, Ashley Judd traced her direct lineage back to William Brewster, the town's namesake.

References

External links

Town of Brewster official website
Brewster Chamber of Commerce tourist information

 
1656 establishments in Massachusetts
Populated coastal places in Massachusetts
Populated places established in 1656
Towns in Barnstable County, Massachusetts
Towns in Massachusetts